Waimate District Council is the territorial authority for the Waimate District of New Zealand.

The council is led by the mayor of Waimate, who is currently . There are also eight ward councillors.

Composition

Councillors

 Mayor: 
 Waimate Ward: Deputy Mayor Sharyn Cain, Fabia Fox, Miriam Morton, David Owen
 Pareora-Otaio-Makikihi Ward: Sandy McAlwee, Tom O'Connor
 Hakataramea-Waihaorunga Ward: Colin Pankhurst
 Waihao Ward: Sheila Paul

History

The council was established in 1989, replacing the Waimate County Council established in 1876.

In 2020, the council had 58 full time equivalent staff, including nine earning more than $100,000. According to the right-wing Taxpayers' Union think tank, residential rates averaged $1,964.

References

External links
 Official website

Waimate District
Politics of Canterbury, New Zealand
Territorial authorities of New Zealand